Hanover House is a colonial house built by a French Huguenot family in 1714–1716, on the upper Cooper River in present-day Berkeley County of the South Carolina Low Country. The house is also known as the St. Julien-Ravenel House after its early owners.

When a state project to dam the river was dammed and create Lake Moultrie was proposed in the 1940s, it would have flooded the site of the house. To preserve the historic structure, the house was moved to the Clemson University campus in Pickens County.

History 

Hanover House was built by Paul de St. Julien, an ethnic French Huguenot, on land by the Cooper River that was a 1688 grant to his grandfather by the Lords Proprietors of South Carolina. His grandfather had sought refuge in the colony from religious persecution by Catholics in France.

The house is a 1½-story cypress wood house with a gambrel roof. It has brick chimneys on either end of the house. There are fireplaces on both the first and second floor. Engraved on a stucco band at the top of one of the chimneys is PEU À PEU, representing the French proverb Peu à peu l'oiseau fait son nid, which is "Little by little, the bird builds his nest." St. Julien named the house Hanover in honor of the House of Hanover, which had ascended the throne of the Kingdom of Great Britain, "to show his appreciation for that country which had befriended so many Huguenot refugees after the Revocation of the Edict of Nantes." The plantation raised indigo and rice as commodity crops, dependent on labor of their enslaved Africans and African Americans.

St. Julien's daughter married Henry Ravenel. The house remained in the family for nearly 200 years.

20th century
In the 1930s the state proposed a project to construct a dam on the Cooper River for flood control and hydroelectric power, creating Lake Moultrie. This historic house and site would have been inundated by the large lake.

In 1941, the house was dismantled and moved to Clemson University, a public university in the northwest part of the state. It was reconstructed on the east side of campus on Cherry Road. In 1994, the house was dismantled again and relocated to the South Carolina Botanical Garden on the university campus. The house is furnished with period reproductions and donations by the Ravenel family.

The Hanover House was listed on the National Register of Historic Places (NRHP) in 1970.

The National Society of the Colonial Dames of America restored the interior of the house as a historic house museum. It is open to the public on weekends. Hours are Saturday, 10:00 a.m.- 12:00 noon & 1:00 p.m. - 4:30 p.m. and Sundays, 2:00 p.m. - 4:30 p.m.

References

External links

Hanover House - Museum information, National Society of the Colonial Dames of America
Hanover House, Pickens County (Clemson University), including 7 photos, at South Carolina Department of Archives and History

French-American culture in South Carolina
Huguenot history in the United States
Houses in Pickens County, South Carolina
National Register of Historic Places in Pickens County, South Carolina
Historic American Buildings Survey in South Carolina
Historic house museums in South Carolina
Houses on the National Register of Historic Places in South Carolina
Museums in Pickens County, South Carolina
Clemson University campus
University museums in South Carolina
National Society of the Colonial Dames of America
Clemson, South Carolina
Relocated buildings and structures in South Carolina
1716 establishments in South Carolina
Houses completed in 1716